Parre is a municipality in Italy.

Parre may also refer to
Parré, an American chocolate company 
Catherine Parr (or Parre; 1512–1548), queen consort of England and Ireland
Ted van der Parre (born 1955), Dutch strongman